Quentin Halys was the defending champion but chose not to defend his title.

Blaž Rola won the title after defeating Ramkumar Ramanathan 6–2, 6–7(6–8), 7–5 in the final.

Seeds

Draw

Finals

Top half

Bottom half

References

External links
Main draw
Qualifying draw

2017 ATP Challenger Tour
2017 Singles
2017 in American tennis
2017 in sports in Florida